Forutqeh (also Romanized as Forūtqeh) is a village in Bala Velayat Rural District, in the Central District of Kashmar County, Razavi Khorasan Province, Iran. At the 2006 census, its population was 2,657, in 739 families.

References 

Populated places in Kashmar County